Bactropota woodi is a species of tephritid or fruit flies in the genus Bactropota of the family Tephritidae.

Distribution
Angola, Malawi, Namibia.

References

Tephritinae
Insects described in 1924
Taxa named by Mario Bezzi
Diptera of Africa